The 6th Women's European Amateur Boxing Championships were held in Vejle, Denmark from October 15 to 20, 2007.
This edition of the recurring competition was organised by the European governing body for amateur boxing, EABA.
Competitions took place in 13 weight classes.

Russia topped the medals table (as they had done in the five previous editions of these championships) winning 6 gold medals — no other country won more than 1. Nicola Adams became the first English woman to win a medal at a major international championship, while Ireland's Katie Taylor won her division for the third successive time.

Medal table

Medal winners

References

European Amateur Boxing Championships
Boxing
Women's European Amateur Boxing Championships
International boxing competitions hosted by Denmark
European
October 2007 sports events in Europe